Calhoun High School is the name of several secondary schools:

 Calhoun High School (Alabama), Calhoun, Alabama
 Calhoun High School (Georgia), Calhoun, Georgia
 Calhoun County Middle-High School (Georgia), Edison, Georgia
 Calhoun High School (Illinois), Hardin, Illinois
 Sanford H. Calhoun High School, Merrick, New York
 Calhoun High School (Texas), Port Lavaca, Texas
 Calhoun County Middle-High School (West Virginia), Mount Zion, West Virginia

See also
Calhoun School in New York
Calhoun Colored School in Alabama